The Apple University Consortium is a partnership between Apple Australia and a number of Australian universities.  Every two years it holds the AUC Academic & Developers Conference in an Australian city. It also sponsors subsidised seats to the WWDC conference in San Francisco each year for university staff and students.

Mission statement
"To enhance and increase computing technology on campus, provide low-cost computing to the University community and, in conjunction with Apple, further develop Apple products and share experiences amongst other tertiary education institutions."

Apple Ceases Funding
As of September 28, 2012 Apple will no longer provide funding for the AUC. The AUC Executive's intention is that programs already announced for 2012 will continue as planned, however, a paper to be circulated in early June will detail the wind-up of the AUC and it is expected that some programs will not be offered as per the AUC Executive's intention.

Members of the AUC

Western Australia
 Curtin University of Technology, Perth, Western Australia
 Edith Cowan University, Perth, Western Australia
 Murdoch University, Perth, Western Australia
 The University of Western Australia, Perth, Western Australia

South Australia
 The Flinders University of South Australia, Adelaide, South Australia
 The University of Adelaide, Adelaide, South Australia
 The University of South Australia, Adelaide, South Australia

Victoria
 Deakin University, Geelong, Victoria
 La Trobe University, Melbourne, Victoria
 Monash University, Melbourne, Victoria
 Swinburne University, Melbourne, Victoria
 Victoria University of Technology, Melbourne, Victoria
 The University of Melbourne, Melbourne, Victoria
 Royal Melbourne Institute of Technology, Melbourne, Victoria

Tasmania
  The University of Tasmania, Hobart, Tasmania

New South Wales
 Charles Sturt University, Wagga Wagga, New South Wales
 Macquarie University, Sydney, New South Wales
 Southern Cross University, Lismore, New South Wales
 The University of New England, Armidale, New South Wales
 The University of New South Wales, Sydney, New South Wales
 The University of Newcastle, Newcastle, New South Wales
 The University of Sydney, Sydney, New South Wales
 The University of Technology, Sydney, Sydney, New South Wales
 The University of Western Sydney, Sydney, New South Wales
 The University of Wollongong, Wollongong, New South Wales

ACT (Canberra)
 The Australian National University, Canberra, Australian Capital Territory

Queensland
 Central Queensland University, Rockhampton, Queensland
 Griffith University, Brisbane, Queensland
 James Cook University, Townsville, Queensland
 The University of Queensland, Brisbane,
 The University of Southern Queensland, Toowoomba, Queensland

Associate Members of the AUC
 Australian Defence Force Academy, Canberra (through ANU)
 The University of Canberra, Canberra (through ANU)
 Queensland University of Technology, Brisbane, Queensland (through Uni Qld)
 The University of the Sunshine Coast, Maroochydore, Queensland (through Griffith Uni)
 SAE Institute, Byron Bay, NSW (through Southern Cross University)

International Associate Member of the AUC
 Dr. Mahalingam College of Engineering and Technology, Pollachi - 642 003, Tamil Nadu, India

References

External links 

College and university associations and consortia in Australia